Rud Aero is an American aircraft manufacturer.

The company occupies a 35,000 sq. ft building at Sebastian Municipal Airport.

Aircraft

References

External links
 
YouTube Videos of Rud Aero aircraft

Aircraft manufacturers of the United States